Ghazni Khel is the third tehsil of lakki marwat and town and union council of Lakki Marwat District in Khyber Pakhtunkhwa province of Pakistan. Ghazni Khel have two famous football Club. One is Muslim CLUB and 2nd is Khan Club.It is located at 32°33'30N 70°44'22E and has an altitude of 287 metres (944 feet). It is located 20km from its district headquarters Lakki Marwat.

References

Union councils of Lakki Marwat District
Populated places in Lakki Marwat District